The 1994 Toledo Rockets football team was an American football team that represented the University of Toledo in the Mid-American Conference (MAC) during the 1994 NCAA Division I-A football season. In their fourth season under head coach Gary Pinkel, the Rockets compiled a 6–4–1 record (4–3–1 against MAC opponents), finished in sixth place in the MAC, and outscored all opponents by a combined total of 352 to 324.

The team's statistical leaders included Ryan Huzjak with 1,928 passing yards, Casey McBeth with 1,053 rushing yards, and Scott Brunswick with 572 receiving yards.

Schedule

References

Toledo
Toledo Rockets football seasons
Toledo Rockets football